is a village located in Shiribeshi, Hokkaido, Japan.

As of September 2016, the village has an estimated population of 1,157. The total area is 280.11 km2.

History
The name derives from Ainu word "hure-pet", meaning "red river".
1899: Akaigawa Village split off from Ōe Village (now Niki Town).
1906: Akaigawa became a Second Class Village.
1991: Kiroro Resort opened.

Geography
The center of Akaigawa is in the Akaigawa Caldera and surrounded by mountains on every side.

Kiroro Resort is on the eastern side of the village.
Mountains: Mount Yoichi, Mount Ponkuto
Rivers: Yoichi River, Shiroigawa River, Akaigawa River

Neighboring cities and towns
 Minami-ku, Sapporo 
 Otaru
 Yoichi
 Niki
 Kutchan
 Kyōgoku

Education
 Akaigawa Junior High School
 Akaigawa Elementary School
 Miyako Elementary School

Culture

Mascot

Her favourite food is a mixture of fresh produce and rice. She usually ends her sentences with "desu no" (ですの) which, along with her eyes, are her charm points. She became the mascot on 18 July 2014.

References

External links

Official Website 

Villages in Hokkaido